In number theory, Berlekamp's root finding algorithm, also called the Berlekamp–Rabin algorithm, is the probabilistic method of finding roots of polynomials over a field . The method was discovered by Elwyn Berlekamp in 1970 as an auxiliary to the algorithm for polynomial factorization over finite fields. The algorithm was later modified by Rabin for arbitrary finite fields in 1979. The method was also independently discovered before Berlekamp by other researchers.

History 
The method was proposed by Elwyn Berlekamp in his 1970 work on polynomial factorization over finite fields. His original work lacked a formal correctness proof and was later refined and modified for arbitrary finite fields by Michael Rabin. In 2000 Peralta's method was generalized for cubic equations.

Statement of problem
Let  be an odd prime number. Consider the polynomial  over the field  of remainders modulo .

Algorithm

Randomization 
Let . Finding all roots of this polynomial is equivalent to finding its factorization into linear factors. To find such factorization it is sufficient to split the polynomial into any two non-trivial divisors and factorize them recursively.

Classification of  elements 
Due to Euler's criterion, for every monomial  exactly one of following properties holds:

 The monomial is equal to  if ,
 The monomial divides  if  is quadratic residue modulo ,
 The monomial divides  if  is quadratic non-residual modulo .

Berlekamp's method 
The property above leads to the following algorithm:

 Calculate remainders of  modulo  by squaring the current polynomial and taking remainder modulo ,
 Using exponentiation by squaring and polynomials calculated on the previous steps calculate the remainder of  modulo ,

Modular square root 
In this particular case problem it is sufficient to calculate only . For this polynomial exactly one of the following properties will hold:

 GCD is equal to which means that both numbers are quadratic residues,
 GCD is equal to which means that exactly one of these numbers is quadratic residue.

Example 
Assume we need to solve the equation . For this we need to factorize . Consider some possible values of :

 Let . Then , thus . Both numbers  are quadratic non-residues, so we need to take some other .

 Let . Then , thus .

Correctness proof 

Complexity 
Let a polynomial have degree . We derive the algorithm's complexity as follows:

References 

Algorithms
Algebra
Number theoretic algorithms
Polynomials